Sobanga is a genus of moths of the family Crambidae. It contains only one species, Sobanga rutilalis, which is found in Brazil.

References

Crambidae genus list at Butterflies and Moths of the World of the Natural History Museum

Eurrhypini
Crambidae genera
Taxa named by Eugene G. Munroe